Goniographa gyulaipeteri is a moth of the family Noctuidae. It is widely distributed in the western Tien-Shan Mountains, in the Hissar and Alai Mountains, in the western Pamirs (Shugnan Range) and also in north-eastern Afghanistan (Badakhshan).

External links
A Revision of the Palaearctic species of the Eugraphe (Hübner, [1821] 1816) Generic complex. Parti. The genera Eugraphe and Goniographa (Lepidoptera, Noctuidae)

Noctuinae
Moths described in 2002